Alexander Larsson (born 7 September 1985) is a Swedish professional ice hockey centre who currently plays for Lørenskog of the Norwegian GET-ligaen.

References

External links

1985 births
Brynäs IF players
Frisk Asker Ishockey players
HV71 players
IF Sundsvall Hockey players
Living people
Lørenskog IK players
Timrå IK players
Södertälje SK players
Sparta Warriors players
Swedish expatriate ice hockey players in Norway
Swedish ice hockey centres